Ferdinand Karl Friedrich Freiherr von Wintzingerode (15 February 1770, in Allendorf – 16 June 1818, in Wiesbaden) was a German nobleman and officer in several different armies of the Napoleonic Wars, finally ending up as a general in the Imperial Russian Army and fighting in the War of the Sixth Coalition against the French invasion of Russia and the subsequent campaigns in Germany and France. He appears in Tolstoy's War and Peace.

Early life 
Ferdinand von Wintzingerode was born into a noble family of Thuringia. His father, baron Wilhelm Levin Ernst von Wintzingerode (1738–1781), owned the Unterhof seigneurial domain near Kirchohmfeld.

Military career 
Ferdinand's first military service was in the Hessian Army, then as a volunteer in the Austrian army in the war against the Netherlands. He took part in the 1792–93 campaigns against the French and, after the Treaty of Campo Formio on 17 October 1797, he was offered a post as major in the Imperial Russian Army. In 1800 the Austrian army gave him permission to fight in the war in Italy.

Napoleonic Wars 
He became a major general and general Aide-de-camp to Alexander I of Russia in 1802 and was entrusted with diplomatic missions over the following years. Also, in 1805 in Berlin, he negotiated with Austria and Great Britain on behalf of the Prussians to form the three nations into an alliance against France. On 11 November 1805, at Dürenstein, he received the Order of St. George. He returned to the Austrian army in 1809, where he was made field marshal. He led the advance guard of the first brigade of general Bellegarde's army on 20 May at Aspern, where he was wounded in the right leg.

He returned to the Russian army in 1812 to face the French invasion of Russia. In it he was made lieutenant general and grand cross of the Military Order of Maria Theresa. On 21 October 1812 he led a unit of Cossacks trying to reach the Kremlin by challenging several French posts at the head of a Cossack unit, but he and his aide de camp Narichzin were captured by lieutenant Leleu de Maupertuis of the 5th Imperial Guard Chasseurs Regiment. He fought at the battle of Lützen before being promoted to General of the cavalry at the battle of Leipzig in 1813. He followed the army of the North into Holland then rejoined the Prussian army under Blücher and fought in the Six Days' Campaign in 1814.

Family
On 19 September 1801 he married the Polish countess Hélène Rostworowska (1783–1829), with whom he had one son.

Bibliography
 Hans Demme / Karl-Heinz Kabisch, Ferdinand Freiherr von Wintzingerode, russischer General und deutscher Patriot (Sonderausgabe der Eichsfelder Heimathefte), Worbis 1986.
 Walter Prochaska, Ferdinand, Freiherr von Wintzingerode. Ein General der Befreiungskriege, .
 Wilhelm Clothar Freiherr von Wintzingerode, General der Kavallerie Ferdinand Freiherr v. Wintzingerode, Ein Lebensbild aus den napoleonischen Kriegen, Arolsen 1902.
 Eberhard v. Wintzingerode, Stammbaum der Familie von Wintzingerode mit biographischen Erläuterungen, Göttingen 1848.
 Heinrich Jobst Graf v. Wintzingerode, Recht tun behält sein Preis allzeit. Die Geschichte der Familie Wintzingerode und der Burg Bodenstein (Bodunger Beiträge 8), Großbodungen 2004, .

Sources

1770 births
1818 deaths
People from Werra-Meißner-Kreis
Imperial Russian Army generals
German commanders of the Napoleonic Wars
Russian commanders of the Napoleonic Wars
Recipients of the Order of St. George of the Second Degree
Recipients of the Order of St. George of the Third Degree
Knights Cross of the Military Order of Maria Theresa
Generals of the Holy Roman Empire